Walter A. Stapleton (born 1947) is a New Hampshire politician.

Early life
Stapleton lived in Fairfield and then Milford, Connecticut.

Military career
Stapleton enlisted into the United States Army Transportation Corps in 1964.

Political career
In 2016, Stapleton ran for a seat in the New Hampshire House of Representatives that represented the Sullivan 10 district, but was defeated. Stapleton was a delegate to the Republican National Convention in 2016. On November 6, 2018, Stapleton was elected to the New Hampshire House of Representatives where he represents the Sullivan 5 district. Stapleton assumed office on December 5, 2018. Stapleton is a Republican. Stapleton is anti-abortion and opposes same-sex marriage.

Personal life
Stapleton moved to Claremont, New Hampshire, in 1983, where he currently resides. Stapleton married Claire in 1968 in Barryville, New York. Together they have three sons. Stapleton is a member of St. Mary's Catholic Church.

References

Living people
Catholics from New Hampshire
People from Fairfield, Connecticut
People from Milford, Connecticut
People from Claremont, New Hampshire
Republican Party members of the New Hampshire House of Representatives
21st-century American politicians
1947 births